Richard Jones (1786 – 6 November 1852) was an English-born politician in New South Wales and Queensland (then part of New South Wales), Australia.

Early life 
Jones was born at Chirbury in Shropshire to Thomas Bowdler Jones, small landowner and brewer, and Elizabeth Ann (née) Philips. He was a clerk in London before migrating to New South Wales, where he became a merchant and pastoralist. In 1823 he married Mary Louisa Peterson, with whom he had eight children.

Politics 
On 30 January 1829, Jones was an appointed member of the New South Wales Legislative Council, a role he held until 5 January 1843. In 1832, the Council changed from a fully appointed body to become a body of 36 members with 12 appointed and 24 elected. From 17 July 1843 Jones continued as an appointed member of the Council. However, even as he appointed, his merchantile business was suffering in the economic downturn that prevailed from 1842 to 1844. In August 1843, he was unable to pay debts of £180,000 and he became insolvent in October 1843, forcing him to resign from the Council, effective 1 November 1843. Barrister Robert Lowe was appointed to the Council to replace him.

Having moved to Brisbane (then part of New South Wales but later in Queensland), on 1 October 1850 Jones was elected as a member of the New South Wales Legislative Council representing the electoral district of Counties of Gloucester, Macquarie, and Stanley (Brisbane being within the County of Stanley). He held the position until 30 June 1851, when the electorate was split into three separate electorates. He was then elected on 1 September 1851 to the Council as the member for the new electoral district of Stanley Boroughs, which included North Brisbane (the settled areas north of the Brisbane River), South Brisbane, Kangaroo Point and Ipswich. He held that position until his death on 6 November 1852.

Later life 
While in Sydney where the Legislative Council met, Jones had a paralytic fit. He returned to his home in New Farm, where he died on Saturday 6 November 1852. On Sunday 7 November 1952, his body was taken by boat to Brisbane where was buried in the North Brisbane Burial Ground with Church of England rites conducted by Reverend H.O. Irwin from St John's. It was estimated that 300 to 400 people attended the burial

Legacy 
One of his sons, also called Richard was appointed as a member of the Legislative Council in 1899 until his death in 1909.

References

 

1786 births
1852 deaths
Members of the New South Wales Legislative Council
Australian people in whaling
Australian ship owners
19th-century Australian businesspeople
English emigrants to colonial Australia
19th-century Australian politicians